Raymond Laborde Correctional Center (RLCC), formerly Avoyelles Correctional Center (ACC), is a state prison of Louisiana, operated by the Louisiana Department of Public Safety & Corrections.

History
In 1989 Frank Polozola, the U.S. district judge in the state, approved a plan for the state to send over 600 state prisoners who were incarcerated in parish jails to state prisons. Avoyelles and Angola were the two state prisons planned to receive most of these prisoners.

In 2011 there was a plan to sell Avoyelles to a private company. The bill failed while in a committee of the Louisiana House of Representatives. In 2012 House Bill 850, which called for the state to look for proposals in privatizing the prison, was launched. The budget under Governor Bobby Jindal called for closing J. Levy Dabadie Correctional Center, having its prisoners go to Avoyelles, and then sell Avoyelles.

The ecumenical chapel at the Avoyelles Correctional Center is a gift of the late Roy O. Martin, Jr., a timber businessman from Alexandria, and his second wife, the former Vinita Johnson (1918-2007), who were advocates of faith-based initiatives in penal institutions.

References

Further reading
 "Officials say privately run Winn prison[...]" The Advocate. April 1, 1991. "The Winn Correctional Center here is doing everything the identical Avoyelles Correctional Center does and more and it is doing it all[...]" Appears on Google News, but the link states that no articles were found.

External links

Raymond Laborde Correctional Center - Louisiana Department of Public Safety & Corrections
"Avoyelles Correctional Center." Louisiana Department of Public Safety & Corrections.

Prisons in Louisiana
Buildings and structures in Avoyelles Parish, Louisiana
Parish jails in Louisiana
1989 establishments in Louisiana